Basketball competitions at the 2015 European Games were held from June 22 to June 26, 2015 at the Basketball Arena in Baku. The competition took place in the half-court 3x3 format, and both the men's and women's tournaments featured sixteen teams. Each qualifying team consisted of four players, of whom three could appear on court at any one time.

Qualification
A NOC may enter one men's team with four players and one women's team with four players. The host country qualifies automatically in each tournament, as do fifteen other teams throughout Europe. The top fifteen teams at the 2014 FIBA Europe 3x3 Championships were also eligible to send a team.

Qualified teams

Medal summary

References

 
European Games
2015
Sports at the 2015 European Games
International basketball competitions hosted by Azerbaijan
2015 in 3x3 basketball